Castle Forbes is a 19th-century country house in the Scottish baronial architecture style near Alford in Aberdeenshire, Scotland.

The  Vale of Alford estate has been home to the Forbes for over 600 years. The original house was named Putachie. The present building overlooking the River Don was built in 1815 by the 17th Lord Forbes, to designs by the architect Archibald Simpson. However, after Simpson encountered structural problems and the original section of the house (from c. 1731) began to crack, Simpson was dismissed and the work was completed by the City Architect of Aberdeen, John Smith.

Today it is occupied by Malcolm Forbes, 23rd Lord Forbes and is open to residential guests. The estate offers fishing and golf. In 1996, a former dairy building was converted into a small perfumery.

The structure is a category B listed building and the grounds are included in the Inventory of Gardens and Designed Landscapes in Scotland.

There is a prehistoric stone circle located to the north of the castle.

References

External links
Official website of Castle Forbes

Castles in Aberdeenshire
Houses in Aberdeenshire
Category B listed buildings in Aberdeenshire
Houses completed in 1815
Inventory of Gardens and Designed Landscapes